The Alberta Schools' Athletic Association (ASAA) is the governing body that oversees amateur athletics in schools for the province of Alberta.  It is a voluntary, non profit organization that has 373 member high schools. It enforces policies as dictated by the provincial board of Governors.

As is the case with all provincial governing bodies for school athletics in Canada, the ASAA is an affiliate member of the United States-based National Federation of State High School Associations.

History
The ASAA was founded in Calgary in 1956 to coordinate high school championships among member schools. After starting their activities by organizing a regional basketball tournament, more sports were added throughout the years, starting with track and field in 1958, badminton, volleyball and cross-country running in the 1960s; gymnastics, wrestling, and curling in the 1970s; and golf, cheerleading and football in the 1980s. Gymnastics was discontinued in 1989. Girls' wrestling was added in 1995. More recently rugby was added in 2006, team handball in 2010, and six-man football in 2011.

The association is structured in 8 geographical zones, Calgary & Edmonton as urban zones, complemented by six rural zones.

District zones
The eight geographic zones of the ASAA are: 

Calgary
Central
Edmonton
North East
North Central
North West
South
South Central

Regional associations
Within these geographic zones, the policies set forth by the ASAA are administered by the regional associations:

Calgary – Calgary Senior High School Athletic Association & Calgary Independent Schools Athletic Association 1
Central – Central Zone of the Alberta Schools' Athletic Association
Edmonton – Edmonton Metro Athletic Association 2
North East –
North Central –
North West – 
South – South Zone of the Alberta Schools' Athletic Association 
South Central – Rocky View Sports Association 3 & South Central Zone of the Alberta Schools' Athletic Association
Notes

Structure
In order to provide a competitive balance, member schools are placed into classifications for all major sports based on the schools' enrollments. Divisions and the tier classification systems are not equivalent. Exact sizes are:

Divisions
 1A schools: fewer than 100 students 
 2A schools: 100–299 students 
 3A schools: 300–799 students 
 4A schools: 800 or more students

Football Tiers
 Tier IV schools: fewer than 450 students (all Division IA and 2A schools, and the smaller Division 3A schools)
 Tier III schools: 450–749 students (mid-sized Division 3A schools)
 Tier II schools: 750–1249 students (largest Division 3A and smaller Division 4A schools)
 Tier I schools: 1250 or more students (largest Division 4A schools)

Team Handball Tiers
 Tier II schools: fewer than 500 students (all Division 1A and 2A schools and the smaller Division 3A schools)
 Tier I schools: 500 or more students (mid-sized Division 3A and Division 4A schools)

Rugby Tiers
 Tier III schools: fewer than 600 students (all Division 1A and 2A schools and the smaller Division 3A schools)
 Tier II schools: 600–1249 students (larger Division 3A schools and the smaller Division 4A schools)
 Tier I schools: 1250 or more students (largest Division 4A schools)

Sports governing bodies
The sports sanctioned by the ASAA are steered by the governing sports bodies and its guidelines to provide an equitable competition and ethical standards for all male and females students and coaches involved within that sports' program.  The governing sports bodies are:

 Athletics Alberta
 Basketball Alberta
 Alberta Curling Federation
 Alberta Golf
 Rugby Alberta
 Alberta Wrestling
 Alberta Badminton
 Alberta Cheerleading Association
 Football Alberta
 Alberta Junior Rugby Association
 Alberta Volleyball
 Alberta Team Handball Federation

Sports
Thirty-three provincial championships are held annually for 12 ASAA sports:

Badminton
Basketball
Boys
Division 1A
Division 2A
Division 3A
Division 4A
Girls
Division 1A
Division 2A
Division 3A
Division 4A
Cheerleading
Cross Country
Curling
Football
Tier I
Tier II
Tier III
Tier IV
6-Man
Golf
Rugby
Tier I
Tier II
Tier III
Team Handball
Track and Field
Volleyball
Boys
Division 1A
Division 2A
Division 3A
Division 4A
Girls
Division 1A
Division 2A
Division 3A
Division 4A
Wrestling (Boys & Girls)
Rural
Provincial

Results from all sports:

Cheerleading 
The first ASAA sponsored provincial cheerleading championship was awarded in 1984.

Football
The first ASAA sponsored provincial Senior Varsity football championship was awarded in 1985.  Due to the cold inclement weather, the inaugural championship games were cancelled, and the competing schools were declared co-champions.

Team Handball 
The first ASAA sponsored provincial Senior Varsity Team handball championship was awarded in April 2010.

Volleyball
The first ASAA sponsored provincial Senior Varsity volleyball championship was awarded in 1964.

References

External links
Alberta Schools' Athletic Association
Calgary Senior High School Athletic Association
Calgary Independent Schools Athletic Association
Rocky View Sports Association
Edmonton Metro Athletic Association
North East Alberta Schools' Athletic Association
North West Alberta Schools' Athletic Association
The South Zone of the Alberta Schools' Athletic Association
The South Central Zone of the Alberta Schools' Athletic Association
Athletics Alberta
Basketball Alberta
Alberta Curling Federation
Alberta Golf
Rugby Alberta
Alberta Wrestling
Alberta Badminton
Alberta Cheerleading Association
Football Alberta
Alberta Junior Rugby Association
Alberta Volleyball
Alberta Team Handball Federation

Sports governing bodies in Alberta
Organizations based in Edmonton